Vanguard Health Systems was an operator of hospitals and other medical facilities in five U.S. states: Arizona, Illinois, Massachusetts, Michigan, and Texas.  The company's headquarters were located in Nashville, Tennessee.  Vanguard owned twenty-six hospitals, including the ten Detroit Medical Center hospitals in Detroit, Michigan, five in San Antonio, Texas, four in the Chicago area, four in the Phoenix, Arizona area, and controlled an additional three hospitals through joint ventures, for a total of 6,201 licensed beds.

On February 26, 2001,  Charles N. Martin, Jr., Chairman, President and CEO of Vanguard Health Systems in Nashville and other investors invested $3.2 million to the combined companies of Health Connections Inc. and Coactive Systems Corporation.

Charles N. Martin, former CEO of Ornda Healthcorp, started Vanguard with funding from Morgan Stanley. The Blackstone Group acquired a majority stake in Vanguard in 2004. The company went public in 2011, with Blackstone continuing to have a controlling stake. Vanguard was acquired by Tenet Healthcare in 2013.

Hospital systems 
 Abrazo Health Care
 Arizona Heart Hospital
 Arizona Heart Institute
 Arrowhead Hospital
 Baptist Health System
 Detroit Medical Center
 Louis A. Weiss Memorial Hospital
 Macneal Hospital
 Maryvale Hospital Medical Center
 Paradise Valley Hospital (Arizona)
 Phoenix Baptist Hospital & Medical Center
 Westlake Hospital
 West Suburban Medical Center
 West Valley Hospital

References

External links

Tenet Healthcare
Hospital networks in the United States
Companies based in Nashville, Tennessee
Companies formerly listed on the New York Stock Exchange
American companies established in 1997
Hospitals established in 1997
2013 mergers and acquisitions
Medical and health organizations based in Tennessee